The 2016 Argentine Primera C was the 116th season of the third tier of football in Argentina. The season began on January and ended on July.

League table

See also
 2016 Argentine Primera División
 2016 Primera B Nacional
 2016 Torneo Federal A
 2015–16 Copa Argentina

References

External links
soccerway.com

Primera C seasons